Princess Marie des Neiges Madeleine Françoise of Bourbon-Parma, Countess of Castillo de la Mota (Spanish: María de las Nieves de Borbón-Parma, French: Marie des Neiges de Bourbon-Parme; born 29 April 1937) is a French aristocrat, ornithologist, and Carlist activist. She is the youngest daughter of Prince Xavier, Duke of Parma and Madeleine de Bourbon-Busset. A progressive Carlist, she supported the liberal reforms to the party made by her elder brother, Prince Carlos Hugo, Duke of Parma, and rejected the conservative faction of the party created by her younger brother, Prince Sixtus Henry, Duke of Aranjuez. In her youth, she was a prominent socialite in Parisian society. Marie des Neiges has a doctorate in biology and worked as an ornithologist. She is a recipient of the  Grand Cross of the Sacred Military Constantinian Order of Saint George and the Grand Cross of the Order of Prohibited Legitimacy.

Early life and family 
Princess Marie des Neiges of Bourbon-Parma was born in Paris on 29 April 1937 to Prince Xavier, Duke of Parma and Piacenza and Madeleine de Bourbon-Busset. Her father was the titular Duke of Parma, the Carlist pretender to the Spanish throne, and the head of the House of Bourbon-Parma. Her mother was the daughter of Georges de Bourbon-Busset, Count de Lignières and a member of the non-dynastic Bourbon-Busset line of the House of Bourbon. She is a sister of Prince Carlos Hugo, Duke of Parma, Princess Marie Thérèse, Princess Cécile Marie, Princess Marie Françoise, and Prince Sixtus Henry, Duke of Aranjuez.

Her father created her Countess of Castillo de la Mota. Throughout her youth, she was active in society and attending various balls, including the Paris Ball held at the French Embassy in Brussels. She was educated in the United States and in Quebec. In 1964, she attending the wedding of Princess Irene of the Netherlands and her brother, Prince Carlos Hugo, in Rome.

Activism 

A Carlist, she supported the progressive reforms of her brother, Carlos Hugo, alongside her sisters Cécile Marie and Marie-Thérèse. She denounced the traditionalist agenda and Carlist claim made by her brother, Sixtus Henry. She attended Carlist gatherings around Spain to support political causes. Marie des Neiges presided over an important gathering of Carlists in Montejurra in 1974. She was present at the Montejurra massacre on 9 May 1976. As a reward for her hard work for Carlism and Spain, she was made Countess of Castillo de la Mota by her father.

In 1976 she was expelled from Spain: she did not care about the order, however, and in response, she visited the spanish city of Santander, where she stayed for two days and where she attended carlist events and where she met great carlist personalities.

Recent years 
In 2016, Marie des Neiges visited the former ducal lands of Parma, and was received by the city of Fontanellato's mayor, Francesco Trivelloni. She had previously visited Parma to attend the christening of her grandnephew Prince Charles Henry of Bourbon-Parma, of whom she was named godmother. In 2018, Marie des Neiges, Marie-Thérèse, and Cécile Marie reconciled with their sister, Marie-Françoise, ending their dispute over conflicting approaches on Carlism. The sisters spent a lot of time together after reconciling. As her sister, Cécile Marie, became ill, she helped care for her. 

In March 2020, upon the death of her sister Marie-Thérèse, Marie des Neiges became the new President of the Academic Senate of the Studium in Monferrato, Italy. The office had belonged to Marie-Thérèse until her death. Marie des Neiges was contacted by Dr. Roger Rossell, Academic Senator in charge of international relations, who asked her if she wanted to become President, and she accepted. She also became President of the «Marie-Thérèse of Borbone-Parma International Award» (so named in honor of her sister), already in its third edition.

She works as a ornithologist and has a doctorate in biology.

Princess Marie des Neiges received a Grand Cross of the Sacred Military Constantinian Order of Saint George, a Grand Cross of the Order of St. Lodovico, and a Grand Cross of the Order of Prohibited Legitimacy.

Ancestry

Honours 
  Duchy of Parma and Piacenza:
 Senator Grand Cross with necklace of the Angelic Imperial Holy Constantinian Order of St. George
 Grand Cross of the Ducal Royal Order of Saint Louis
 Grand Cross of the Order of Prohibited Legitimacy

References

External links 

Official website of the House of Bourbon-Parma
Second official website of the House of Bourbon-Parma
Biography of Her Royal Highness Princess Marie des Neiges

Living people
1937 births
20th-century Roman Catholics
21st-century Roman Catholics
Carlists
French ornithologists
Nobility from Paris
Princesses of Bourbon-Parma
French people of Italian descent
French people of Spanish descent
French Roman Catholics
Spanish countesses
Women ornithologists